The Dreaming Girl is a Chinese animated television series. It is produced by "Beijing Golden Pinasters Animation Company" in Beijing with the collaboration of CCTV.

Background
The production was acknowledged as an official project as early as 2001. The show is known for its heavy emphasis on high-level detailed environment.

Story
The story is about a 13-year-old school girl and her friends in an ever-expanding story dealing with contemporary teenage problems of growing up. Fantasy and dreams add elements of surrealism.

References

External links
 Company Website
 CCTV Dreaming Girl

Chinese animated television series
Animated romance television series
2005 Chinese television series debuts
2000s animated television series
China Central Television original programming
Mandarin-language television shows